Tulumella is a genus of crustaceans belonging to the monotypic family Tulumellidae.

The species of this genus are found in Central America.

Species:

Tulumella bahamensis 
Tulumella grandis 
Tulumella unidens

References

Crustaceans